"Pasarela" (English: Catwalk) is the third official single of Daddy Yankee's latest album Prestige. It was released through El Cartel and Sony Music on May 27, 2012 to radios and digitally on July 10, 2012.

Track listing
"Pasarela" — 3:55

Music video
The music video of "Pasarela" was released on June 22, 2012 through El Cartel and Sony Music. In the video, Daddy Yankee is shown dating a fashion model. It has more than twenty-one million hits on YouTube.

Charts

Weekly charts

Year-end charts

References

External links

Daddy Yankee songs
2012 singles
Songs written by Daddy Yankee
2012 songs